The 2012 Aegon GB Pro-Series Shrewsbury was a professional tennis tournament played on indoor hard courts. It was the fifth edition of the tournament which was part of the 2012 ITF Women's Circuit. It took place in Shrewsbury, United Kingdom, on 17–23 September 2012.

WTA entrants

Seeds

 1 Rankings are as of 10 September 2012.

Other entrants
The following players received wildcards into the singles main draw:
  Lucy Brown
  Anna Fitzpatrick
  Francesca Stephenson
  Jade Windley

The following players received entry from the qualifying draw:
  Amy Bowtell
  Anne Kremer
  Angelica Moratelli
  Charlène Seateun

The following player received entry by a lucky loser spot:
  Julia Kimmelmann

Champions

Singles

  Annika Beck def.  Stefanie Vögele, 6–2, 6–4

Doubles

  Vesna Dolonc /  Stefanie Vögele def.  Karolína Plíšková /  Kristýna Plíšková, 6–1, 6–7(3–7), [15–13]

External links
 ITF tournament website
 Official site

Aegon GB Pro-Series Shrewsbury